Luis Biera (born 25 December 1958) is an Argentine former cyclist. He competed in the individual road race event at the 1984 Summer Olympics.

References

External links
 

1958 births
Living people
Argentine male cyclists
Olympic cyclists of Argentina
Cyclists at the 1984 Summer Olympics
Place of birth missing (living people)